Leslie Earl Barnhart (February 23, 1905 – October 7, 1971) was an American Major League Baseball pitcher who played for two seasons. He played for the Cleveland Indians in 1928 and 1930.

In three appearances which included two starts, Barnhart posted a 1–1 record with a 6.75 earned run average in 17.1 innings pitched with only two strikeouts.

External links

1905 births
1971 deaths
Cleveland Indians players
Major League Baseball pitchers
People from Hoxie, Kansas
Baseball players from Kansas
McCook Generals players